European Parliament elections were held in France on 15 June 1989. Six lists were able to win seats: an alliance of the centre right Union for French Democracy and the Gaullist Rally for the Republic, an alliance of the Socialist Party and the Parti Radical de Gauche, The Greens, the French Communist Party, the Front National and a list of dissenting members of the Union for French Democracy.  48.8% of the French population turned out on election day.

Results

France
European Parliament elections in France
Europe